Gustavo Eddy Balart Marin (born February 10, 1987) is a Cuban mixed martial artist competing in the Strawweight division of ONE Championship. He has previously competed for the Titan Fighting Championships (Titan FC). He is currently ranked #4 in the ONE Championship Strawweight rankings.

Balart is also a former amateur Greco-Roman wrestler who competed in the men's featherweight category.

Greco-Roman wrestling career 
Gustavo Balart defeated Venezuela's Jorge Cardozo for the gold medal in his division at the 2011 Pan American Games in Guadalajara, Mexico.

Balart represented Cuba at the 2012 Summer Olympics in London, where he competed in the men's 55 kg class. He defeated Turkey's Ayhan Karakuş in the preliminary round of sixteen, before losing the quarterfinal match to South Korea's Choi Gyu-Jin, with a three-set technical score (0–1, 2–0, 0–1), and a classification point score of 1–3.

Mixed martial arts career
Balart made his professional mixed martial arts debut on August 1, 2015.

ONE Championship 
Gustavo Balart made his ONE Championship debut against Tatsumitsu Wada at ONE: Roots of Honor in the ONE Flyweight World Grand Prix Quarterfinal on April 12, 2019. He lost by unanimous decision in controversial fashion. 

In his next bout, Balart faced Chan Rothana at ONE: Dreams of Gold on August 16, 2019. He lost by unanimous decision.     

Balart was scheduled to face Robin Catalan at ONE: Masters of Fate on November 8, 2019. Balart lost the fight by second-round knockout via head kick.  

Gustavo Balart was able to pick up his first promotional victory with a unanimous decision over Ryuto Sawada at ONE: Battleground on July 30, 2021.

He picked up his second consecutive win with another unanimous decision over former Shooto Flyweight Champion and ONE Strawweight Champion Yosuke Saruta at ONE 156 on April 22, 2022.

Balart faced former ONE Strawweight World Champion Alex Silva on October 21, 2022, at ONE 162. At the weigh-ins, Balart failed the hydration test and was forced to take catchweight of 130.75 lbs, 5.75 lbs over the strawweight limit. He won the fight via split decision.

Mixed martial arts record

|-
|Win
|align=center| 11–4 
|Alex Silva
|Decision (split) 
|ONE 162: Zhang vs. Di Bella
|
|align=center|3
|align=center|5:00  
|Kuala Lumpur, Malaysia
|
|-
|Win
|align=center| 10–4 
| Yosuke Saruta
|Decision (unanimous)
|ONE 156: Eersel vs. Sadikovic
|
|align=center|3
|align=center|5:00
|Kallang, Singapore
| 
|-
|Win
|style="text-align:center;"|9–4
|Ryuto Sawada
|Decision (unanimous)
|ONE: Battleground
|
|style="text-align:center;"|3
|style="text-align:center;"|5:00
|Kallang, Singapore
|
|-
|Loss
|align=center| 8–4
|Robin Catalan
|KO (head kick)
|ONE: Masters of Fate
||
|align=center| 2
|align=center| 4:43
|Manila, Philippines
|
|-
|Loss
|align=center| 8–3
|Chan Rothana
|Decision (unanimous)
| ONE: Dreams of Gold
||
|align=center| 3
|align=center| 5:00
|Bangkok , Thailand
| 
|-
|Loss
|align=center| 8–2
|Tatsumitsu Wada
|Decision (unanimous)
| ONE: Roots of Honor
||
|align=center| 3
|align=center| 5:00
|Manila , Philippines
|
|-
|Win
|style="text-align:center;"|8–1
|Wascar Cruz
|KO (punches)
|Titan FC 52: Soares vs. Uruguai
|
|style="text-align:center;"|1
|style="text-align:center;"|0:20
|Ft. Lauderdale, Florida USA
|
|-
|Win
|style="text-align:center;"|7–1
|Victor Dias
|Decision (unanimous)
|Titan FC 50: Manfio vs. Outlaw
|
|style="text-align:center;"|3
|style="text-align:center;"|5:00
|Ft. Lauderdale, Florida USA
|
|-
|Loss
|style="text-align:center;"|6–1
|Juan Puerta
|KO (flying knee)
|Titan FC 48: Torres vs. Orellano
|
|style="text-align:center;"|3
|style="text-align:center;"|2:14
|Ft. Lauderdale, Florida USA
|
|-
|Win
|style="text-align:center;"|6–0
|Bruno Mesquita
|Decision (split) 
|Titan FC 47: Yusuff vs. Gomez
|
|style="text-align:center;"|3
|style="text-align:center;"|5:00
|Ft. Lauderdale, Florida USA
|
|-
|Win
|style="text-align:center;"|5–0
|Marcelo Castaneda
|Decision (unanimous) 
|Titan FC 46: Torres vs. DeJesus
|
|style="text-align:center;"|3
|style="text-align:center;"|5:00
|Pembroke Pines, Florida USA
|
|-
|Win
|style="text-align:center;"|4–0
|Jorge Calvo Martin
|Decision (split) 
|Titan FC 45: Araujo vs. Capitulino
|
|style="text-align:center;"|3
|style="text-align:center;"|5:00
|Pembroke Pines, Florida USA
|
|-
|Win
|style="text-align:center;"|3–0
|Dez Moore
|Decision (unanimous) 
|Titan FC 44: Torres vs. Sharipov
|
|style="text-align:center;"|3
|style="text-align:center;"|5:00
|Pembroke Pines, Florida USA
|
|-
|Win
|style="text-align:center;"|2–0
|Carlos Hernandez
|Decision (unanimous) 
|Titan FC 43: Torres vs. Nobre
|
|style="text-align:center;"|3
|style="text-align:center;"|5:00
|Coral Gables, Florida USA
|
|-
|Win
|style="text-align:center;"|1–0
|Mauricio Gomez Oquendo
|Decision (unanimous) 
|Latin Fighting Championship 7
|
|style="text-align:center;"|3
|style="text-align:center;"|5:00
|Bogota, Colombia
|

See also
List of current ONE fighters

References

External links
Profile – International Wrestling Database
NBC Olympics Profile

1987 births
Living people
Olympic wrestlers of Cuba
Wrestlers at the 2012 Summer Olympics
Wrestlers at the 2011 Pan American Games
Pan American Games gold medalists for Cuba
Sportspeople from Santiago de Cuba
Cuban male sport wrestlers
Pan American Games medalists in wrestling
Medalists at the 2011 Pan American Games
Cuban male mixed martial artists
Mixed martial artists utilizing Greco-Roman wrestling